The 2014 Copa Gobierno de Córdoba was a professional tennis tournament played on clay courts. It is the only edition of the tournament which was part of the 2014 ATP Challenger Tour. It took place in Córdoba, Argentina between 20 and 26 October 2014.

Singles main-draw entrants

Seeds

 1 Rankings are as of October 13, 2014.

Other entrants
The following players received wildcards into the singles main draw:
  Tomás Lipovšek Puches
  Federico Coria
  Renzo Olivo
  Pedro Cachín

The following players received entry from the qualifying draw:
  José Hernández
  Hugo Dellien
  Marco Trungelliti
  Martín Cuevas

Champions

Singles

  Alejandro González def.  Máximo González, 7–5, 1–6, 6–3

Doubles

  Marcelo Demoliner /  Nicolás Jarry def.  Hugo Dellien /  Juan Ignacio Londero, 6–3, 7–5

Copa Gobierno de Córdoba